Narayanpur is a village in Manjhi block, Saran district of Bihar, India.  the 2011 Census of India, it had a population of 586 across 79 households.

References 

Villages in Saran district